Bartholomew of Grottaferrata (Rossano, c. 970 – Grottaferrata, November 11, 1055) or Bartholomew the Younger was an Italo-Greek abbot at the monastery at Grottaferrata.

Like Nilus the Younger, Bartholomew was of Greek heritage. He was also a personal disciple of the founder of the abbey Nilus the Younger. He would in time be Nilus' third successor in the position of abbot. When he succeeded Nilus as abbot, he supervised the completion of the abbey, of which he is considered the second founder. Under his administration, which continued for some forty years, the monastery established a firm basis which would allow it to continue to this day.

Bartholomew the Younger was also a hymn-writer and noted calligrapher like his teacher. He is also described as having a very sympathetic nature, and being unable to see anyone suffer without giving that party comfort.

He is regarded as a saint, with a feast day of November 11.

See also
Abbazia del Patire

References

Bibliography
Donald Attwater and Catherine Rachel John, "The Penguin Dictionary of Saints," 3rd edition, New York: Penguin Books, 1993, .
Santa Maria de Grottaferrata 

970 births
1055 deaths
Italian abbots
People from Rossano